Due to Vermont's election law requiring a majority to secure a congressional seat, the 1st district required three ballots to choose a winner.

See also 
 Vermont's 2nd congressional district special election, 1797: Winner of 2nd district race declined to serve.
 United States House of Representatives elections, 1796 and 1797
 List of United States representatives from Vermont

References 

United States House of Representatives elections in Vermont
Vermont
United States House of Representatives
Vermont
United States House of Representatives